The Men's 400 metres hurdles event at the 2011 World Championships in Athletics was held at the Daegu Stadium on August 29, 30 and September 1.

In the final, Angelo Taylor in lane 1 and L. J. van Zyl in lane 8 bookended the field going out fast into the lead.  As they were completing the final turn, Taylor faltered and started hitting hurdles while Javier Culson powered into the lead.  Both van Zyl and Culson slowed going into the final hurdle while David Greene cleared the hurdle with full momentum, cruising past the others to take the gold medal.

Medalists

Records

Qualification standards

Schedule

Results

Heats
Qualification: First 4 in each heat (Q) and the next 4 fastest (q) advance to the semifinals.

Semifinals
Qualification: First 2 in each heat (Q) and the next 2 fastest (q) advance to the final.

Final

References

External links
400 metres hurdles results at IAAF website

Hurdles 400
400 metres hurdles at the World Athletics Championships